No More Stories EP is an EP by Danish alternative rock band Mew, released on 28 June 2009. It contains two tracks from the subsequent studio album No More Stories... released barely two months later, plus three previously unreleased B-sides.

Track listing

References 

Mew (band) albums
2009 EPs